Joe De La Cruz was a Mexican-American character actor who worked in Hollywood from the late 1910s through the early 1940s. He often played villains.

Selected filmography 

 Under Fiesta Stars (1941)
 Adventures of Captain Marvel (1941)
 North West Mounted Police (1940)
 The Tulsa Kid (1940)
 South of the Border (1939)
 Frontiers of '49 (1939)
 Panamint's Bad Man (1938)
 The Fighting Devil Dogs (1938)
 The Vigilantes Are Coming (1936)
 Unconquered Bandit (1935)
 Four Frightened People (1934)
 Law and Lawless (1932)
 The Forty-Niners (1932)
 Trailing the Killer (1932)
 Hidden Valley (1932)
 The Hurricane Horseman (1931)
 Rogue of the Rio Grande (1930)
 A Devil with Women (1930)
 Call of the West (1930)
 Hell's Heroes (1929)
 Western Yesterdays (1924)
 The Santa Fe Trail (1923)
 The Bearcat (1922)
 The Night Riders (1920)

References 

Mexican male film actors
Mexican actors
1892 births
1961 deaths
Mexican emigrants to the United States
Male Western (genre) film actors